Southsiders is the seventh studio album by American hip hop duo Atmosphere. The album was released via Rhymesayers Entertainment on May 6, 2014. The title Southsiders refers to the south side of Minneapolis.

Critical reception 

Upon its release, Southsiders was met with generally positive reviews from music critics. At Metacritic, which assigns a normalized rating out of 100 to reviews from critics, the album received an average score of 70, based on 9 reviews, indicating "generally favorable reviews".

Commercial performance
The album debuted at number eight on the Billboard 200 chart, with first-week sales of 23,159 copies in the United States through the independent hip hop label Rhymesayers Entertainment.

Track listing

Chart positions

Weekly charts

Year-end charts

References

External links
 

2014 albums
Atmosphere (music group) albums
Rhymesayers Entertainment albums